Movin' Upside the Blues is an album by organist Jimmy McGriff recorded in 1981 (with one track from late 1980) and released on the Jazz America Marketing (JAM) label.

Reception 

Allmusic's Scott Yanow said: "As usual, most of the music is blues-based, although the inclusion of "Moonlight Serenade" in this soul-jazz setting is a pleasant surprise".

Track listing
 "Moonlight Serenade" (Glenn Miller, Mitchell Parish) – 6:30
 "All Day Long" (Kenny Burrell) – 11:02
 "Could Be" (Jimmy McGriff, Jimmy Ponder) – 5:34
 "Free and Foxy" (McGriff, Ponder) – 6:12
 "Movin' Upside the Blues" (McGriff) – 5:24
Recorded on December 19, 1980 (track 2), June 23, 1981 (tracks 4 & 5) and June 24, 1981 (tracks 1 & 3)

Personnel
Jimmy McGriff – organ
Bill Hardman (tracks 4 & 5), Danny Moore (track 2)  – trumpet
Bill Easley (track 2), Arnold Sterling (tracks 1 & 3-5) – alto saxophone
Harold Vick – tenor saxophone (track 2)
Jimmy Ponder – guitar
Vance James (tracks 1 & 3-5), Victor Jones (track 2) − drums
Richard Byrd – congas (track 2)

References

Jimmy McGriff albums
1982 albums
Albums produced by Bob Porter (record producer)
Albums recorded at Van Gelder Studio